7369 Gavrilin, provisional designation , is a stony Phocaean asteroid, sizable Mars-crosser, and binary system on an eccentric orbit from the inner regions of the asteroid belt, approximately  in diameter. It was discovered on 13 January 1975, by Russian astronomer Tamara Smirnova at the Crimean Astrophysical Observatory in Nauchnyj, on the Crimean peninsula. The assumed S-type asteroid has a long rotation period of 49.1 hours. It was named after Russian composer Valery Gavrilin. The discovery of its 2.4-kilometer sized minor-planet moon was announced in October 2008.

Orbit and classification 

Gavrilin is both a member of the main belt's Phocaea family and a member of the Mars-crossing asteroids, a dynamically unstable group between the main belt and the near-Earth populations, crossing the orbit of Mars at 1.66 AU.

It orbits the Sun in the inner asteroid belt at a distance of 1.6–3.1 AU once every 3 years and 8 months (1,332 days; semi-major axis of 2.37 AU). Its orbit has an eccentricity of 0.32 and an inclination of 22° with respect to the ecliptic.

Numbering and naming 

This minor planet was numbered on 23 January 1997. It was named after the awarded Russian composer Valery Gavrilin (1939–1999). The asteroid's name was suggested by the Union of Concert Workers of Russia, and its official  was published by the Minor Planet Center on 24 January 2000.

Physical characteristics 

Gavrilin is an assumed, stony S-type asteroid, the most common spectral type in the inner asteroid belt. The assumption also agrees with the overall spectral type for the Phocaea family.

Rotation period and satellite 

In January 2008, rotational lightcurves of Gavrilin were obtained from photometric observations by the BINAST group including David Higgins at the Hunters Hill Observatory  in Australia and Petr Pravec at the Ondřejov Observatory in the Czech Republic. Lightcurve analysis gave a rotation period of 49.12 hours with a brightness amplitude of 0.25 magnitude.
The photometric observation also revealed that Gavrilin is a synchronous binary asteroid with a minor-planet moon in its orbit. The discovery was announced in October 2008. The satellite measures approximately 2.41 kilometers in diameter (a secondary-to-primary diameter-ratio of at least 0.32) and has an orbital period identical to that of the primary's rotation, 49.12 hours.

Diameter and albedo 

According to the survey carried out by the NEOWISE mission of NASA's Wide-field Infrared Survey Explorer (WISE), Gavrilin measures 4.91 and 5.49 kilometers in diameter and its surface has an albedo of 0.27 and 0.28, respectively. A 2017-WISE-study dedicated to Mars-crossing asteroids determined a diameter of 5.51 kilometers despite a higher albedo of 0.305. The Collaborative Asteroid Lightcurve Link assumes a standard albedo for a stony asteroid of 0.20 and calculates a diameter of 5.74 kilometers based on an absolute magnitude of 13.61, while the Johnston's Archive estimates a diameter of 7.54 kilometers for the primary.

Sizable Mars-crosser 

With a diameter of 5.5 kilometers, Gavrilin is one of the smallest "sizable" Mars-crossers (5–15 km). These include 3581 Alvarez (13.7 km) 1065 Amundsenia (9.8 km), 1139 Atami (9.4 km), 3737 Beckman (14.4 km), 1474 Beira (15.5 km), 5682 Beresford (7.3 km), 1011 Laodamia (7.4 km), 6170 Levasseur (5.7 km), 1727 Mette (5.4 km), 1131 Porzia (7.1 km), 1235 Schorria (5.6 km), 985 Rosina (8.2 km), 1310 Villigera (15.2 km), and 1468 Zomba (7 km), which are themselves smaller than the largest members of this dynamical group, namely, 132 Aethra, 323 Brucia (former Mars-crosser), 1508 Kemi, 2204 Lyyli and 512 Taurinensis, all larger than 20 kilometers.

Notes

References

External links 
 Asteroids with Satellites, Robert Johnston, johnstonsarchive.net
 Asteroid Lightcurve Database (LCDB), query form (info )
 Dictionary of Minor Planet Names, Google books
 Discovery Circumstances: Numbered Minor Planets (5001)-(10000) – Minor Planet Center
 
 

007369
007369
Discoveries by Tamara Mikhaylovna Smirnova
Named minor planets
007369
19750113